The 1908 Alabama Crimson Tide football team (variously "Alabama", "UA" or "Bama") represented the University of Alabama in the 1908 Southern Intercollegiate Athletic Association football season. It was the Crimson Tide's 16th overall and 13th season as a member of the Southern Intercollegiate Athletic Association (SIAA). The team was led by head coach J. W. H. Pollard, in his third year, and played their home games at the University of Alabama Quad in Tuscaloosa and the Birmingham Fairgrounds in Birmingham, Alabama. They finished the season with a record of six wins, one loss and one tie (6–1–1 overall, 1–1–1 in the SIAA).

After opening the 1908 season with three consecutive shutouts, Alabama lost their only game of the season, 11–6, at Georgia Tech. After a victory over Chattanooga and a tie against Georgia, Alabama played the Haskell Institute. Against Haskell, Alabama scored a touchdown on a 65-yard interception return, Haskell missed a field goal, and another Haskell drive ended with an interception deep in Alabama territory. In the season finale against Tennessee, Alabama back Derrill Pratt attempted eight field goals and made only one for a 4–0 Alabama victory.

Schedule

Scoring note:

Notes

References
General

 

Specific

Alabama
Alabama Crimson Tide football seasons
Alabama Crimson White football